Thomas Oliver (-1624) was an English logician, mathematician, and medic.

He worked in Bury St. Edmunds, and died in 1624.

Works 
Oliver wrote a treatise De Sophismatum Praestigiis Cavendis Tractatus Paraeneticus in 1583, which was published in Cambridge in 1604 and reprinted in Frankfurt in 1605.

References 

English non-fiction writers
1624 deaths